This is a list of railway lines in Hungary.

Railways

Lines (1–9) 
 1 Budapest–Hegyeshalom–Rajka (191 km) - (Hegyeshalom–Rajka) operated by GySEV
 2 Budapest–Esztergom (53 km)
 4 Esztergom–Almásfüzitő (42 km)
 5 Székesfehérvár–Komárom (82 km)
5b Mór–Pusztavám (12 km)
 6 Bicske–Székesfehérvár (49 km)
6 Vál Valley Light Railway (6 km)
 8 Győr–Sopron (85 km) - operated by GySEV
 9 Fertővidéki HÉV (10 km) - operated by GySEV

Lines (10–19) 
 10 Győr–Celldömölk (72 km)
 11 Győr–Veszprém (79 km)
 12 Tatabánya–Oroszlány (15 km)
 13 Tatabánya–Pápa (94 km)
 14 Pápa–Csorna (37 km)
 15 Sopron–Szombathely (62 km) - operated by GySEV
 16 Hegyeshalom–Szombathely (111 km) - operated by GySEV
 17 Szombathely–Nagykanizsa (102 km) - (Szombathely–Zalaszentiván) operated by GySEV
 18 Szombathely–Kőszeg (18 km) - operated by GySEV
 (19) Fertővidéki HÉV (10 km) - operated by GySEV

Lines (20–29) 
 20 Székesfehérvár–Szombathely (169 km) - (Porpác–Szombathely) operated by GySEV
 21 Szombathely–Szentgotthárd (55.4 km) - operated by GySEV
 22 Körmend–Zalalövő (23 km) - operated by GySEV
 23 Rédics–Zalaegerszeg (49 km)
 24 Zalabér-Batyk–Zalaszentgrót (6 km)
 25 Bajánsenye–Zalaegerszeg–Ukk–Boba (101 km)
 26 Balatonszentgyörgy–Tapolca–Ukk (35 km)
 27 Lepsény–Veszprém (39 km)
 29 Székesfehérvár–Tapolca (117 km)

Lines (30–39) 
 30 Székesfehérvár–Gyékényes (221 km)
30a Budapest–Székesfehérvár (67 km)
 35 Kaposvár–Siófok (100 km)
 36 Kaposvár–Fonyód (54 km)
 37 Somogyszob–Balatonszentgyörgy (59.3 km)
 38 Nagyatád–Somogyszob (6 km)

Lines (40–49) 
 40 Pusztaszabolcs–Pécs (228 km)
40a Budapest–Pusztaszabolcs (67 km)
 41 Dombóvár–Gyékényes (101 km)
 42 Pusztaszabolcs–Dunaújváros–Paks (79 km)
 43 Mezőfalva–Rétszilas (21 km)
 44 Pusztaszabolcs–Székesfehérvár (30 km)
 45 Sárbogárd–Székesfehérvár (39 km)
 46 Sárbogárd–Bátaszék (84 km)
 47 Dombóvár–Komló (18.8 km)
 48 Keszőhidegkút-Gyönk–Tamási (12.5 km)
 49 Dombóvár–Lepsény (75 km)

Lines (50–59) 
 50 Dombóvár–Bátaszék (60 km)

Lines (60–69) 
 60 Gyékényes–Pécs (115 km)
 61 Sellye–Szentlőrinc (24 km)
 62 Barcs–Villány (101 km)
 64 Pécs–Bátaszék (68 km)
 65 Pécs–Villány–Magyarbóly (43 km)
 66 Villány–Mohács (43 km)

Lines (70–79) 
 70 Budapest–Szob (62.9 km)
 71 Budapest–Vácrátót–Vác (49 km)
 75 Vác–Balassagyarmat (70 km)
 76 Diósjenő–Romhány (17 km)
 77 Aszód–Vácrátót (15 km)
 78 Aszód–Balassagyarmat–Ipolytarnóc (100 km)

Lines (80–89) 
 80 Hatvan–Miskolc–Szerencs–Sátoraljaújhely/Nyíregyháza (266 km)
80a Budapest–Hatvan (67 km)
 81 Hatvan–Somoskőújfalu (66.1 km)
 82 Hatvan–Szolnok (68 km)
 83 Mátramindszent–Mátranovák–Homokterenye (5 km)
 84 Kisterenye–Kál-Kápolna (55 km)
 85 Vámosgyörk–Gyöngyös (13 km)
 86 Vámosgyörk–Újszász–Szolnok (78 km)
 87 Eger–Putnok (68 km)
87a Füzesabony–Eger (67 km)
 88 Mezőcsát–Nyékládháza (20 km)
 89 Tiszaújváros–Nyékládháza (33 km)

Lines (90–99) 
 90 Miskolc–Hidasnémeti (62 km)
 92 Miskolc–Bánréve–Ózd (58 km)
 94 Miskolc–Tornanádaska (57.5 km)
 95 Kazincbarcika–Rudabánya (15 km)
 98 Szerencs–Hidasnémeti (51 km)

Lines (100–109) 
 100 Szolnok–Debrecen–Nyíregyháza–Záhony (226 km)
100a Budapest–Cegléd–Szolnok (100 km)
 101 Püspökladány–Biharkeresztes (51 km)
 102 Kál-Kápolna–Kisújszállás (74 km)
 103 Karcag–Tiszafüred (44.4 km)
 105 Debrecen–Nyírábrány (31 km)
 106 Debrecen–Sáránd–Nagykereki (53 km)
 107 Debrecen–Sáránd–Létavértes (33 km)
 108 Debrecen–Füzesabony (103 km)
 109 Debrecen–Tiszalök (64 km)

Lines (110–119) 
 110 Debrecen–Nyírbátor–Mátészalka (78 km)
 111 Mátészalka–Záhony (57 km)
 112 Nagykálló–Nyíradony (23 km)
 113 Nyíregyháza–Mátészalka–Zajta (101 km)
 114 Mátészalka–Csenger (33 km)
 115 Mátészalka–Nagykároly (18 km)
 116 Nyíregyháza–Vásárosnamény (58.2 km)
 117 Ohat-Pusztakócs–Nyíregyháza (83 km)

Lines (120–129) 
 120 Szolnok–Békéscsaba–Lőkösháza (125 km)
120a Budapest–Újszász–Szolnok (100 km)
 121 Békéscsaba–Kétegyháza–Mezőhegyes–Újszeged (123 km)
 125 Mezőtúr–Orosháza–Mezőhegyes–Battonya (116 km)
 126 Kisszénás–Kondoros (6 km)
 127 Körösnagyharsány–Vésztő–Gyoma (84 km)
 128 Békéscsaba–Kötegyán–Vésztő–Püspökladány (124 km)
 129 Murony–Békés (7.3 km)

Lines (130–139) 
 130 Szolnok–Hódmezővásárhely–Makó (144 km)
 135 Szeged–Békéscsaba (97 km)
 136 Szeged–Szabadka (15 km)

Lines (140–149) 
 140 Cegléd–Szeged (118 km)
 142 Budapest–Lajosmizse–Kecskemét (98 km)
 145 Szolnok–Kiskunfélegyháza (65 km)
 146 Kecskemét–Kunszentmárton (56 km)
 147 Kiskunfélegyháza–Orosháza (79 km)

Lines (150–155) 
 150 Budapest–Kunszentmiklós-Tass–Kelebia (158 km)
 151 Kunszentmiklós-Tass–Dunapataj (49.6 km)
 152 Fülöpszállás–Kecskemét (43 km)
 153 Kiskőrös–Kalocsa (35 km)
 154 Bátaszék–Baja–Kiskunhalas (96 km)
 155 Kiskunhalas–Kiskunfélegyháza (46 km)

Other rail lines 
 260 Budapest Cog-wheel Railway
 Békéscsaba–Nagyvárad railway
 Budapest Castle Hill Funicular
 Mezőhegyes–Battonya railway
 Sopron–Bécsújhely railway
 Sopron–Ebenfurt railway
 Veresegyház–Gödöllő railway

 Budapesti HÉV railway lines:
 250 Budapest–Szentendre
 251 Budapest–Csepel
 252 Budapest–Ráckeve
 253 Budapest–Gödöllő

Narrow gauge railways 

 7 Children's railway, Budapest (11.2 km)
8a Széchenyi Museum railway, Nagycenk (3.6 km) 
 39 Balatonfenyves Light Railway (14 km)
 118 Nyír Area Light Railway to Balsa (51 km)
 119 Nyír Area Light Railway to Dombrád (39 km)
 148 Kecskemét Light Railway to Kiskunmajsa (52 km)
 149 Kecskemét Light Railway to Kiskőrös (54 km)
 305 Csömödér State Forest Railway (109 km)
 307 Kaszó State Forest Railway (8 km)
 308 Almamellék Forest Railway to Sasrét (39 km);  narrow gauge
 309 Almamellék Forest Railway to Lukafa (51 km);  narrow gauge
 310 Gemenc State Forest Railway (32 km)
 311 Mesztegnyő State Forest Railway (8.4 km)
 317 Királyrét Forest Railway (11.5 km)
 318 Szob–Nagybörzsöny Forest Railway (20.8 km)
 319 Kemence Forest Museum Railway (7.2 km);  narrow gauge
 321 Felsőtárkány State Forest Railway (4.8 km)
 323 Szilvásvárad Forest Railway (4.5 km)
 324 Mátra Railway to Mátrafüred (6.3 km)
 325 Mátra Railway to Szalajkaház (13.1 km)
 330 Lillafüred State Forest Railway to Garadna (13.9 km)
 331 Lillafüred State Forest Railway to Mahóca (10.6 km)
 332 Pálház State Forest Railway (7 km)
 333 Zsuzsi Forest Railway (16 km)

See also
 Hungarian State Railways (MÁV)

External links

 
 

 
Hungary